Katja Beer (born 10 October 1976) is a German biathlete. She competed in the women's individual event at the 1998 Winter Olympics.

References

External links
 

1976 births
Living people
Biathletes at the 1998 Winter Olympics
German female biathletes
Olympic biathletes of Germany
Place of birth missing (living people)
20th-century German women